The men's hammer throw event at the 1977 Summer Universiade was held at the Vasil Levski National Stadium in Sofia on 23 August.

Results

References

Athletics at the 1977 Summer Universiade
1977